Bar/None Records is an independent record label based in Hoboken, New Jersey.

Early history
Tom Prendergast started Bar/None in early 1986 in Hoboken, New Jersey. Having previously worked in pirate radio and booked and promoted bands in his native Ireland, Prendergast moved to Hoboken in 1982.

The first release on Bar/None was by Rage to Live, whose leader, Glenn Morrow, soon became a partner in the label. Morrow had already built a network of contacts in the alternative music community having toured nationally with his previous band, The Individuals, and had also worked in the A&R department of Warner Bros. and as the managing editor of New York Rocker magazine. In 2000, Prendergast left New Jersey and moved back to Ireland, sold his shares to Morrow.

The Bar/None debut album of They Might Be Giants sold more than 100,000 copies and their follow-up, Lincoln, more than doubled those sales.

Other artists that started on Bar/None and went on to the major record labels include Luka Bloom, Yo La Tengo (Atlantic/Matador), Freedy Johnston (Elektra) and Tindersticks (London/PolyGram).

Artists (past and present)

As of 2019, there have been over one-hundred and twenty artists signed to Bar/None Records.

See also
 List of record labels

References

Sources

External links
 Official site

 
Record labels established in 1986
American independent record labels
Indie rock record labels
Alternative rock record labels
Hoboken, New Jersey
1986 establishments in New Jersey
Mass media in Hudson County, New Jersey